Geovanna Santos da Silva (born 15 February 2002) is a Brazilian rhythmic gymnast. She represented Brazil at the 2020 Summer Olympics in the group all-around.

Career 
Santos began rhythmic gymnastics when she was six years old in Pinheiros. She began competing with Brazil's senior rhythmic group in 2021.

Santos competed at the 2021 Pan American Championships in Rio de Janeiro. The group won the gold medal in the group all-around and secured the continental quota place for the 2020 Olympic Games. The group additionally won the gold medals in both the 5 balls and the 3 hoops + 4 clubs event finals.

She was selected to compete for Brazil at the 2020 Summer Olympics in the group all-around alongside Maria Eduarda Arakaki, Déborah Medrado, Nicole Pírcio, and Beatriz Linhares. They finished twelfth in the qualification round for the group all-around.

In 2022, thanks to Natalia Gaudio and Brazil’s internal ranking being more open, she switched to individual competition. Santos participated in World Cups, such as Pesaro 2022. 

Santos competed at the 2022 Pan American Gymnastics Championship in Rio De Janeiro, Brazil, winning silver in the team competition as well as the All-Around.

References

External links
 
 

2002 births
21st-century Brazilian women
Brazilian rhythmic gymnasts
Competitors at the 2022 South American Games
Gymnasts at the 2020 Summer Olympics
Living people
Olympic gymnasts of Brazil
South American Games bronze medalists for Brazil
South American Games gold medalists for Brazil
South American Games medalists in gymnastics
South American Games silver medalists for Brazil
Sportspeople from Espírito Santo